The Tesla Model Y is a battery electric compact crossover manufactured by Tesla, Inc. Unveiled in March 2019, it started production at its Fremont plant in January 2020, and started deliveries on March 13, 2020.

The Model Y is based on the Model 3 sedan platform. It shares an estimated 75 percent of its parts with the Tesla Model 3, which includes a similar interior and exterior design and electric powertrain. The Model Y fills a smaller and less expensive segment than the mid-sized Tesla Model X. Like the Model X, the Model Y offers optional third-row seats for a seven-passenger seating capacity. 

There were four planned powertrain configurations for the Model Y: Standard Range Rear-Wheel Drive (RWD), Long Range Rear-Wheel Drive, Long Range with Dual Motor All-Wheel Drive (AWD), and Performance (with Dual Motor All-Wheel Drive). The Long Range AWD model and the Performance model are currently being delivered. By February 7, 2021, the Long Range RWD appears to have been canceled. As of December 6, 2021, Tesla formally notified people who had pre-ordered the Long Range RWD that their chosen configuration is no longer available.

History

In 2013, Tesla Motors filed to trademark "Model Y".

In 2015, Elon Musk teased a Model 3-based Model Y with falcon-wing doors.

In 2017, the Model Y's silhouette was teased to Tesla shareholders at the annual general meeting in June. Elon Musk also announced that the Model Y would be produced in a new factory, as it was not likely that the Fremont plant would have room to accommodate another production line.

In June 2018, a new silhouette was revealed by CEO Musk. With the new image, it was stated that the Model Y would be formally announced in March 2019. The Model Y announcement had been planned for 2018; however, production problems with the Model 3 resulted in it being pushed to 2019. In October 2018, Elon Musk revealed that he has approved the finalized design for the first production version of the Model Y, however production would not start until 2020. On March 3, 2019, Elon Musk published multiple tweets, announcing the unveiling event and confirming some specifications. Musk confirmed the vehicle would use standard doors, as opposed to the falcon-wing doors used on the Model X.

On March 14, 2019, Elon Musk premiered the Tesla Model Y at an event at Tesla's design studio in Hawthorne, CA, where specifications were announced and the vehicle was shown. Test drives of multiple Model Y vehicles were also offered to attendees after the presentation. Due to its larger size, the Y consumes more energy than the 3, and thus has shorter range. The Fremont factory was changed to accommodate production of the Y.

In November 2019, Tesla announced that the Tesla Model Y would be the first vehicle to be assembled at the first European Gigafactory, Giga Berlin.

On January 29, 2020, Tesla reported in its Q4 2019 earnings report that Model Y production had already started in the Fremont factory, that one can now place an order for their premium versions with all-wheel drive, and that delivery of Model Y would begin in Q1 2020.

On March 13, 2020, Tesla made their first deliveries of the Model Y, along with publishing its owner's manual.

On August 13, 2020, it was reported that Tesla Fremont would soon activate the world's largest unibody casting machine for Model Y production, switching to casting the rear body in a single piece. Elon Musk told an interviewer that the Berlin-made Model Y is "not just a copy of the Model Y. It's actually a radical redesign of the core technology of building a car." For the made-in-Berlin Model Y, rear and front portions of the frame will be a single-cast design. Injecting molten aluminum into a cast and having robots pull out the molded metal allows Tesla to combine several manufacturing steps. This manufacturing process is expected to result in significant cost savings, reducing a complex structural frame of dozens of parts, requiring many hours of welding to be reduced to just 1 part. Other savings include lower tool investments, reduced production time, lower number of robots, and a smaller production area.

On June 5, 2020, Tesla launched the Model Y Online design studio for the Chinese market, allowing customers in China to place orders for the upcoming made-in-China Model Y. First delivery of the model was made on January 18, 2021.

Initial production of the made-in-China Model Y began in mid-December 2020 with 250,000 Model Y expected to be produced in 2021 in China alone.

On September 8, 2020, Volkswagen Group Chairperson of the Board of Management, Herbert Diess, wrote about the Model Y: "This car is for us in many aspects (not in all!) a reference: user experience, updatability, driving features, performance of the top of the range models, charging network, range. Big advantage: Model Y was/is thought through as an electric car – as is the ID.3. Many of our competitors still using their ICE platforms. The result: They aren’t getting the best EVs."

On October 7, 2020, Musk tweeted that Giga Berlin Model Y would get single-piece rear and front frame cast, structural battery pack, and new 4680 cells.

On January 1, 2021, Tesla started selling the Model Y in China, and it sold out its planned production (an unknown quantity) for Q1 2021 within 6 days.

On January 7, 2021, Tesla released the Standard Range Rear Wheel Drive Model Y as well as the optional 7-seat, third-row seating configuration.

On July 25, 2021, CEO Elon Musk revealed that Tesla was planning to release an updated design for the Model Y by the end of 2021. In addition, Tesla planned to implement their new structural battery pack to improve range. These new cars would be manufactured by the two new Tesla production facilities in Austin, Texas and Berlin, Germany. If Tesla was not able to roll out the new 4680 battery cells by the end of 2021, they would use the standard battery cells until the 4680's are ready.

Specifications

Heat pump 
The Model Y is Tesla's first car to use a heat pump instead of electric resistance for interior cabin heating. Some electric vehicles from other manufacturers, including the Nissan Leaf, Renault Zoe, BMW i3 EV, Jaguar I-Pace, Audi e-tron, and Kia Niro, had already implemented heat pumps. In cold weather, the Model Y heat pump can be up to 300% more efficient than other Tesla cars' use of electric resistance heating. Because of this, the Model Y should be more energy efficient than other Tesla cars in cold weather. Electric cars can lose 40% or more of their range in cold weather (at ambient temperatures below ) when heating the interior cabin.

During his teardown of the Model Y, auto analyst Sandy Munro found a component that has been referred to as the "octovalve", which appears to be the next iteration of the superbottle component used in the Model 3. Musk has said that the new heat pump system/octovalve is one of the two most significant changes in the Model Y over the Model 3, the other being the new rear underbody casting. The octovalve supports the Model Y heat pump as part of the car's thermal management system.

Radar 
Vehicles produced since May 2021 lack radar for adaptive cruise control. In February 2022, the National Highway Traffic Safety Administration opened an investigation over phantom braking in these new vehicles.

Software update 2022.20.9 transitioned radar equipped Model Ys (and Model 3s) to Tesla Vision.

Production

Tesla originally announced plans at the unveil to assemble the Model Y at Giga Nevada (in Sparks, Nevada), along with the battery and drivetrain for the vehicles, unlike the Model 3, where drivetrains and batteries are assembled at Giga Nevada, with final assembly completed at the Tesla Factory in Fremont, California. Two months later, in May 2019, Tesla said that they instead planned to shuffle production lines at the Tesla Fremont Factory to make space for Model Y production. Later, Model Y would also be assembled at Giga Shanghai in China and Giga Berlin in Germany.

United States deliveries started in March 2020 for the Long Range AWD version and the Performance version. Later in 2020, Tesla began shipping cars to the Canadian and Mexican markets.

In November 2020, Tesla signed an agreement with LG Chem to supply battery cells for Model Y production in China.

Safety

Reception

The Model Y has been generally very well received. Critics laud the car's appearance, quick acceleration, spacious interior and range. The clumsy handling and stiff ride are often touted as improvement points. 
According to Top Gear, the Model Y is a "great car to live with". The Model Y is also touted as the sales leader in its class  but competition is rising with numerous alternatives hitting the market from other manufacturers.

See also
 List of production battery electric vehicles
Tesla Supercharger
List of Tesla vehicles

References

External links

 

2020s cars
Cars introduced in 2019
Crossover sport utility vehicles
Electric car models
Electric cars
Production electric cars
Model Y